was a member of Japan's Hōjō clan of nobles and courtiers; the brother of Hōjō Yoshitoki, shogunal regent, Tokifusa was appointed to the Kyoto-based government post of Rokuhara Tandai upon its creation in 1221, following the Jōkyū War. He served alongside Hōjō Yasutoki.

He later became a Buddhist monk, and lived out the rest of his life at Tō-ji in Nara, where he acquired the nickname "Daibutsu" (Great Buddha).

References
Frederic, Louis (2002). Japan Encyclopedia, Cambridge, Massachusetts: Harvard University Press.

1175 births
1240 deaths
Tokifusa
People of Heian-period Japan
People of Kamakura-period Japan
Kamakura period Buddhist clergy